Possagno is a comune in the Province of Treviso, in the Italian region Veneto.

Possagno borders the following municipalities: Alano di Piave, Castelcucco, Cavaso del Tomba, Paderno del Grappa.

Antonio Canova (1757-1822), the great neoclassical sculptor was born in Possagno. He chose to erect the Tempio Canoviano in the city, a structure he designed, financed, and partly-built himself. 
The temple has become one of the city's landmarks with the museum of the Gipsoteca Canoviana dedicated to the sculptor and built around his birthplace, which houses various sketches and plaster casts of his famous works as well as many of his paintings. The extension of the plaster casts gallery was carried out by the architect Carlo Scarpa.

In 2022 we will celebrate the 200th anniversary of the death of Antonio Canova, which took place in Venice on 13 October 1822, considered the greatest exponent of Neoclassicism in sculpture and, for this reason, nicknamed “the new Phidias”. The organizational machine foresees special exhibitions and restorations, between Possagno, Canova's hometown and Bassano del Grappa, which together represent the most important “Canova center” in the world.

Culture

Education 
 Cavanis "Canova" Institute: founded in 1857 at the behest of Bishop Giovanni Battista Sartori, brother of Antonio Canova, it is one of the oldest and most renowned schools in Italy and in the area. Managed by the Congregation of Charity Schools (CSCh.), Its former students include Mario Moretti Polegato, founder and CEO of Geox, and singer Francesca Michielin, winner of the 5th edition of X Factor and runner-up at the 66th edition of the Sanremo Festival.

Gallery

Demographic evolution

References

External links
 The Museum Gypsotheca Antonio Canova

Cities and towns in Veneto